Midnight Angel is a 1976 album by Barbara Mandrell.

Midnight Angel may also refer to:

"Midnight Angel" (song), the title track and lead single from the Barbara Mandrell album
"Midnight Angel", a song by Penny McLean from the album Penny
Midnight Angel, one of the wrestling personae of Japanese wrestler Io Shirai